Mended is a 2002 album by American Latin pop singer-songwriter Marc Anthony.

Mended may also refer to:

 Repaired
 "Mended" (song), song by Australian singer and songwriter Vera Blue

See also
 
 Mend (disambiguation)